Banca Intermobiliare di Investimenti e Gestioni S.p.A. known as Banca Intermobiliare or just BIM is a Turin-based wealth management bank.

History
Banca Intermobiliare (BIM) was majority owned by Veneto Banca, an unlisted cooperative bank (People's Bank) that was bail-out by a private equity fund Atlante in 2016. In 2017, Veneto Banca was declared insolvent and under administrative liquidation. Intesa Sanpaolo, the largest bank of Italy by capitalization, bought most of the good assets of Veneto Banca and their sister bank Banca Popolare di Vicenza (BPVi) on 26 June 2017. However, Banca Intermobiliare and sister bank FarBanca (of BPVi group) were excluded. On 6 July 2017, Veneto Banca made an open invitation to sell Banca Intermobiliare. In September 2018, Banca Intermobiliare approved the strategic plan for three-year (2019-2021).

After being taken private, the bank was restructured and renamed Banca Investis in 2022.

References

External links

 

Banks of Italy
Banks established in 1981
Italian companies established in 1981
Companies based in Turin